Many governments publish open data they produce or commission on official websites to be freely used, reused, or redistributed by anyone. These sites are often created as part of open government initiatives.

Some open data sites like CKAN and DKAN are open source data portal solutions where as others like Socrata are proprietary data portal solutions. 

The data sites provide interfaces based on Data and Metadata standards like Dublin core.

List of Supranational Open Government Data Sites

List of national-level open government data sites

Unofficial National-level Data Sites 
Some countries have unofficial open data portals created citizen initiatives or published by non-governmental organizations.

List of Subnational Open Government Data Sites

List of Municipal Open Government Data Sites

See also 
CKAN
Data.gov
List of datasets for machine-learning research
Open data
Open government
Open Government Initiative
Open Knowledge Foundation
Smart city
Socrata

External links 

Data.gov List of Open Data Portals
DataPortals.org
Global Open Data Index
Open Data Inception
Portals: GitHub Gist
RList: Major Smart Cities with Open Data Portals

References 

Data sites
Lists of websites